This article describes UK usage.  United States usage may be different.

A dock shunter, or "dock tank", is a locomotive (formerly steam but now usually diesel) used for shunting wagons in the vicinity of docks.  It is usually of 0-4-0 or 0-6-0 wheel arrangement and has a short wheelbase and large buffers.  These features make it suitable for negotiating sharp curves.

Examples

 GWR 1101 Class
 GWR 1361 Class
 GWR 1366 Class
 LSWR B4 Class
 LB&SCR E2 Class
 SR USA Class
 British Rail Class 07
 LMS Fowler Dock Tank
 NLR Class 75
 Bagnall 0-4-0ST "Alfred" and "Judy"
 LSWR G6 Class
 LNER J63
 LNWR Dock Tank
 LNER Y9
 Caledonian Railway 498 Class
 LNER J88

See also

 Switcher

Locomotives